The Prowler is an alias used by several fictional characters appearing in American comic books published by Marvel Comics. These characters are primarily depicted as wearing a green and purple battle suit with a cape and clawed gauntlets. The original version Hobart "Hobie" Brown was created by Stan Lee, John Buscema and Jim Mooney, and was introduced in The Amazing Spider-Man #78 (November 1969) as an African-American teenage prodigy who created the Prowler technology to operate as a petty thief, but was subsequently redeemed with help from Peter Parker / Spider-Man and has since been a viable ally as well as a superhero in his own right. The Ultimate Marvel equivalent Aaron Davis was created by Brian Michael Bendis and Sara Pichelli, and introduced in Ultimate Comics: Spider-Man #1 (November 2011) as the career criminal uncle of Miles Morales / Spider-Man.

Both Hobie Brown and Aaron Davis have appeared in several media adaptations outside of comics, with the former being primarily featured in animated television series and the latter in films. Davis has been portrayed by Donald Glover in the live-action Marvel Cinematic Universe film Spider-Man: Homecoming (2017) and voiced by Mahershala Ali in the animated film Spider-Man: Into the Spider-Verse (2018).

Publication history

The original and most well-known iteration of Prowler, Hobie Brown, debuted in The Amazing Spider-Man #78 (November 1969), and was created by writer Stan Lee and artists John Buscema and Jim Mooney. The character eventually appeared in his own solo comic titled The Prowler. The character was inspired by Romita's 13-year-old son John Romita Jr. who sketched a villain called the Prowler. Lee liked the name but not the costume; Romita combined the name with a design that he had previously intended for a character called the Stalker that was intended for the never-published The Spectacular Spider-Man #3.

Several other characters have taken up the Prowler identity as well. The second version first appeared in Peter Parker, The Spectacular Spider-Man #47 (October 1980), and was created by Stan Lee and artist Steve Ditko. The third version, Rick Lawson, first appeared in The Sensational Spider-Man #16 (May 1997), and was created by writer Todd DeZago and artist Mike Wieringo.

The Ultimate Marvel iteration of Prowler, Aaron Davis, first appeared in Ultimate Comics: Spider-Man #1 (November 2011), and was created by writer Brian Michael Bendis and artist Sara Pichelli.

Fictional character biography

Hobie Brown
Hobie Brown is the original iteration of Prowler. Born in the Bronx, New York, he was a bright but angry African-American teenager who got fired from his window washer job. Intending to use his engineering skills for personal profit, he devised a plan to steal items while disguised as a supervillain and then return said items as Hobie. Donning his green and purple Prowler costume for the first time, Hobie set out to rob the payroll office of the Daily Bugle, figuring that would garner him quick publicity. However, he was caught in the act by Peter Parker. While struggling with Parker, he drew editor J. Jonah Jameson's attention. Parker, with no way to defeat Prowler without giving away his own secret identity, contrived to get thrown through a window during the struggle, and used spider-powers to save himself once outside. Traumatized by the events, the shaken Hobie made his escape to the building's roof, only to be confronted by Spider-Man. Spider-Man vanquished and unmasked Hobie, but realized he was just a misunderstood kid (just like Peter once was), so instead of handing him over to the police, he advised him to rethink his life.

Hobie took Spider-Man's advice to heart and gave up his criminal ways. He later impersonated Spider-Man at the hero's request - Spider-Man wearing a webbing mask - to convince Peter's friends that Parker was not Spider-Man after Peter 'confessed' the truth while suffering delirium due to the flu, thus creating the impression that Parker had merely been confused. Hobie was convinced that Spider-Man was involved somehow in Police Captain George Stacy's death, and unsuccessfully tried to bring Spider-Man to justice. Hobie eventually married his love Mindy S. McPherson, and settled down into a career as a construction worker.

Hobie began to look after his 'little brother' Manuel "Manny" Lopez as a part of the Big Brother Program. When Manny was murdered, Prowler believed the White Tiger (Hector Ayala) was responsible and attempted to bring White Tiger to justice. Prowler attempted to join the super-hero group the Defenders, only to be tossed into the harbor by Valkyrie, at which point he decided to retire his identity. However, his Prowler equipment is later stolen by a cat burglar to commit crimes for fashion criminal Bella Donna. Hobie was eager to join the search for the thieves, but Spider-Man insisted that he stay home so he would not get into trouble, since the second Prowler had committed a felony murder. When the second Prowler was subsequently defeated by Spider-Man, the stolen equipment was returned to Hobie.

Prowler later appeared in California during Peter's Webs book deal. He is first seen attacking the Black Fox (Raul Chalmers) for possession of a chalice in order to keep Mindy out of prison. Mindy accepted a bookkeeping job at Transcorp New York. The company was caught in some shady stock deals and Mindy was set up and blamed for the crimes. Seeing it as the only way to clear Mindy's name, Hobie re-donned his Prowler costume and found the books which Mindy had been blamed for stealing. He hid the books on an information chip and put the information chip on the chalice, where no one would look for it. Prowler and Spider-Man then teamed up to take on the Black Fox in order to regain possession of the chalice. Hobie vindicated his wife of stock fraud charges with the help of Spider-Man and the Black Fox.

Prowler later attempted to vindicate Spider-Man of a crime and first encountered Silver Sable and the Outlaws (including rehabilitated villains like Sandman, Rocket Racer and Puma). His safety designs were stolen by Justin Hammer. Hobie proved the design flaws during an encounter with Hammer's hirelings. Hobie fought Black Tiger (a.k.a. his brother Abraham Brown of the Sons of the Tiger) as an initiation test for Silver Sable. Prowler joined with Spider-Man and the Outlaws against the Avengers and the Space Phantom. Prowler was hired along with the Outlaws to retrieve a Symkarian nuclear device in England. Prowler then formally joined the Outlaws to rescue the kidnapped daughter of a Canadian official.

His costume and equipment were stolen by Nightcreeper and Prowler then battled him and the Vulture (Adrian Toomes). This story also revealed that his brother is Abraham.

Later, Hobie was paralyzed during the Great Game. In follow-up appearances, he began regaining movement of his paralyzed limbs- evidence suggests that his paralysis was more a result of mental rather than physical damage, as he was feeling frustrated over the recent theft of his costume, eventually regaining full mobility. While recovering, Brown provided Spidey with a jetpack used when assuming the Hornet identity during the Identity Crisis storyline.
 
Prowler was captured by S.H.I.E.L.D. in Ms. Marvel's Civil War tie-in. Escaping incarceration, he attended the wake for Stilt-Man (Wilbur Day), along with many other villains and former villains. Prowler narrowly escaped injury as Spider-Man and Puma escorted him from the wake shortly before it was bombed by the Punisher.

When Peter Parker elevated Parker Industries into a global franchise with Spider-Man officially acting as a "bodyguard" as part of the All-New, All-Different Marvel branding, Hobie Brown is hired to act as Spider-Man in situations where the public would expect to see Peter and Spider-Man in the same place. Following the fight against Zodiac's Pisces Sect, Peter tells Hobie to change into his Prowler costume and that they'll retrieve the Webware together before Zodiac undoes his encryption.

Before The Clone Conspiracy storyline and crossover, wanting to know more about New U Technologies, Peter sent Prowler to infiltrate. He ended up encountering Electro (Francine Frye). Prowler was chased around by Electro and was accidentally killed. In the aftermath, Doctor Rita Clarkson took Spider-Man to where some people that were subjected to the New U Technologies treatment were being held. The Prowler was among those people, as it turned out that he was not killed by Electro. Julia Carpenter later talks to the real Prowler, who just emerged from cryo-sleep, and tells him about his clone's actions. Hobie is then seen talking to Peter about his future, wondering which direction he will take. He then heads home, where he is last seen conflicted about his own identity.

Hobie next attacks the F.E.A.S.T. Center, which was re-established by May Parker. He tells Spider-Man that he was investigating a crowdfunding group called Fairgray Pay after he funneled some money to help a sick friend, which never reached him, and broke into the center since it's almost wholly funded by the group. He and Spider-Man break into the company's head office with help from Marnie, Peter's neighbor known also as The Rumor. After an intense battle, Spider-Man, Prowler and the Rumor escape, with help from Captain America. Prowler is left in his home after being knocked out from the fight. He later wakes up to find that Spider-Man managed to defeat the head of Fairgray Pay with help from Iron Man who bought the company and turned into a division of Stark Unlimited. During their conversation, Prowler is offered a job as the new head of Fairgray Pay, which he quickly accepts.

During the "King in Black" storyline, Hobie Brown is shown to have taken up the alias of Hornet during the Symbiote invasion.

Second version
At one point, Bella Donna (Narda Ravanna) stole Hobie Brown's costume and equipment and hired a cat burglar that Spider-Man fought a long time ago to become the new Prowler. During one of his crimes, Prowler accidentally kills a guard. Furthermore, the witnesses see his silhouetted profile and believe Spider-Man to be implicated in the murder. Eventually, Spider-Man captures both Bella Donna and the Prowler, clears both his and the original Prowler's name, and returns Hobie's stolen equipment. This Prowler is later seen at the "Bar With No Name" attending Stilt-Man's wake, and calls himself the "Second Prowler". He has a brief fight with the original Prowler at Stilt-Man's funeral. Sometime after the original Prowler leaves, the Punisher poisons the guests' drinks and blows the place up. It is later mentioned that "they all had to get their stomachs pumped and be treated for third-degree burns".

Rick Lawson
Rick Lawson is the third incarnation of Prowler. A medical intern, he was present when Hobie Brown was brought into the hospital where he worked due to a back injury. The costume was partly cut away to conceal Hobie's superhero identity, but his friends were unwilling to risk moving him due to the back injury, leading to Lawson finding a portion of the costume that was left unattended and deducing Hobie's identity. After finding Hobie's address from his medical files, Lawson steals a replica of the Prowler costume, using new tech to both rob patients in the ICU and get revenge on those who had "wronged" him in the past, such as a construction foreman who fired him when needing the job to complete medical school. He has an encounter with the Vulture, who seeks revenge against the original Prowler and nearly kills him, but Spider-Man interferes and defeats Vulture. Afterwards, Lawson is taken to the hospital and the Prowler costume is returned to Hobie (who is still recovering from paralysis).

Hobie Brown (Clone)
The fourth iteration of Prowler is a clone of Hobie Brown. The Jackal cloned Hobie, with all of his memories apparently intact. After learning about the Jackal's mission, Prowler became loyal to him and started acting as a spy to find out what Parker Industries was up to. It is revealed that this Prowler is a clone that Jackal had gathered to grow clones with false memories that span all the way to their deaths.

After stopping a bank robbery that a clone of Madame Web foresaw, Prowler returns to New U Technologies to stop a fight between clones of Jack O'Lantern, Kangaroo, Massacre, Mirage, Montana, and Tarantula. Jackal reminds Hobie that Hobie was brought back to keep the reanimated supervillains in line and that Hobie is wanted to warn when he leaves the building so his technology does not go out into the world. Knowing how annoying it is to be stuck in the same location, Jackal assigns Hobie to take care of a potential hacker in San Francisco. When Hobie goes to get more information on the hacker from Madame Web, he is told that of seeing buildings filled with agony that cannot escape. After confronting his killer, Electro, Prowler figures out Madame Web's precognition and goes to Alcatraz where he sets off a trap and gets caught in the process. Hobie wakes up in a cell in Alcatraz and discovers that the hacker is Julia Carpenter who has been using the Shroud's leftover technology to investigate New U Technologies. Hobie angers Julia by severing a connection from looking more into New U Technologies. Back at the company, the villains are getting out of control, so Jackal sends Electro to find Prowler to put under check again. Julia senses that Madame Web is alive from telepathic feedback resulting from Electro's attack. Prowler tells Julia what New U Technologies has accomplished and tries to get Julia to join them but refuses and escapes in a puff of black smoke. Prowler's body then starts failing due to not taking his New U Pills for an extended period of time as he questions what he's doing with his life. He is then confronted by Electro. Prowler tries to escape Electro's wrath in Alcatraz, which proves difficult with Electro's powers and his dying body. Using his weapons, the gift shop and his strategic thinking, Prowler manages to defeat the simple-minded Electro. When he makes it outside, he is found by Julia taking him on a boat and heads towards New U Technologies to get his New U Pills.

When Spider-Man and Spider-Woman of Earth-65 are escaping from New U Technologies, Prowler helped the two out by diverting the cloned villains to another part of the city.

Julia helps Prowler break into New U Technologies and takes Prowler to his room to get his pills. When the Jackal orders the villains in the "Haven" part of New U Technologies to kill Spider-Man, Prowler works with Spider-Man to fight the villains off. When the alarm goes off and all the clones start breaking down from clone degeneration, Prowler leaves Haven and tries to find the individual set off the system that has been killing the clones. Prowler accuses Julia of being the culprit. He tries to fight and Julia is left with no choice but to fight back, knocking him down as Prowler's body continues deteriorating.

The clone assists Jean DeWolff's clone in helping Spider-Man get away from the villains. During the final battle, Prowler and DeWolff battle the villains outside. Hobie's body is rapidly decaying, but the two receive assistance from Gwen Stacy of Earth-65 and Kaine Parker. Gwen leaves Hobie in an alley when he proves too weak to continue and he's found by the murderous Electro. Julia arrives and fends Electro off as Hobie is told that Spider-Man stabilized the human and clone cells. When Electro gets the upper hand on Julia, Prowler sacrifices himself to stop Electro and dies in Julia's arms. Kaine later tells Spider-Man that the clones of Prowler and Jean died while fighting the villains.

Powers and abilities
The Prowler's various iterations have no superhuman powers, although Hobie Brown is naturally inventive, especially in the field of pneumatics despite no formal education in that science. Each one relies on a suite of technical gimmicks. Prowler wears modified coveralls interwoven with denim and stretch fabric, equipped with gas cartridge bracelets and anklets capable of propelling projectiles at high velocity. Their arsenal of projectiles include steel darts ("flechettes"), gas pellets, small explosives, magnesium flares and cleaning fluid. Prowler has been known to use hypnotic aids and conventional hand-held weapons. Each wears steel-tipped gauntlets for scaling walls and shock absorbent foam rubber insulated boots. He also wears a cape which contains a network of pneumatic filaments which expand with air to give it a rigid structure, allowing him to glide for short distances.

A technological genius, Hobie Brown has also designed the cybernetically-controlled wing harness used by Hornet (Peter Parker during Identity Crisis), although he himself was unable to use it due to the weight. He is a skilled hand-to-hand combatant, possessing a green belt in taekwondo.

Reception
 In 2022, Screen Rant included Prowler in their "10 Best Marvel Characters Who Made Their Debut In Spider-Man Comics" list.

Other versions

House of M
In the altered timeline of the "House of M" storyline, Hobie Brown serves as a technician in Luke Cage's resistance.

Marvel Zombies
A zombified version of Prowler (Hobie Brown) is seen during the Ultimate Fantastic Four story "Crossover". He is depicted in a scene standing near the side of Tigra on the two-page layout of the zombies.

Ultimate Marvel
The Ultimate Marvel versions of Hobie Brown and Rick Lawson are alluded on a list of cat burglars on the Daily Bugle database.

Aaron Davis
The Ultimate Marvel incarnation of Prowler is Aaron Davis, the uncle of Miles Morales and the brother of Jefferson Davis. Whereas Jefferson reformed by marrying Rio Morales, Aaron never came around and became the cat burglar "Prowler." In his first appearance, he broke into Oscorp's abandoned lab to steal a small red box and other rare items from a safe but Oscorp's genetically altered spider crawled into his duffel bag without his knowledge. Miles later visits his uncle's apartment and is bitten by Oscorp's spider. After Miles passes out and regains consciousness, Jefferson forbids Aaron to spend time with Miles on account of his criminal life.

During a visit to Mexico City, Aaron fights off the Mexican crime boss Scorpion. When his deal with Scorpion goes bad, he is detained by Mexican authorities. Returning to New York, Prowler interrogates the Tinkerer about the Green Goblin. Realizing his nephew is Spider-Man, Prowler kills the Tinkerer to keep this a secret. He then claims Tinkerer's various tech for himself: an electric suit, a winged suit and electric gauntlets. Davis uses his winged suit in a vain attempt to kill Scorpion. The next day, Aaron confronts his nephew about being Spider-Man. Davis initially convinces Spider-Man to assist in defeating Scorpion, however, Spider-Man comes to the realization of his uncle's exploitation. When Miles decides to sever their relationship, Aaron threatens to tell Jefferson and Rio of his nephew's secret identity. Spider-Man ultimately gets into a fight with Aaron that results in Aaron's gauntlets exploding, killing him but not before accusing his nephew of being just like him. Spider-Man later discovers that Aaron was hired to break into Oscorp by Donald Roxxon, and was revealed to be Turk Barrett's criminal acquaintance when he and Jefferson used to commit various crimes in their youth.

Sometime after the "Secret Wars" storyline, Aaron is seen on Earth-616 alive and well. Equipped with a recolored variant of "Iron Spider" armor, he forms his version of Sinister Six (consisting of Bombshell (Lori Baumgartner), Electro, the Hobgoblin, Sandman, and the Spot) and manages to have a reunion with Spider-Man trying to stop him. Despite Spider-Man's attempts, the Sinister Six carry out Aaron's heist and take off aboard a decommissioned S.H.I.E.L.D. Helicarrier.

When the Champions interrupt a meeting with Lucia von Bardas as a buyer, Spider-Man attempts to persuade his uncle to give up his criminal ways. Although the chaos results in his apparent death, Aaron is later revealed to be alive, seemingly having followed his nephew's advice. Miles later goes to visit his reformed uncle.

After Miles is kidnapped by the villain Assessor, Aaron obtains a new Prowler suit and tracks them down. With the help of Jefferson, who is using S.H.I.E.L.D. weaponry, Aaron rescues Miles, although Assessor escapes.

After escaping from Ultimatum, Miles' burner clones, and Ultimatum's henchmen, Spider-Man II and Prowler run into the Green Goblin and the Goblinoids. As Spider-Man II and Prowler fight the Goblinoids, the Green Goblin states that a pulse will go off where anyone who took the Goblinoid drug will turn into the next wave of Goblinoids. As Jefferson shows up to aid Captain America in fighting the Goblinoids, Bombshell and Starling catch up to Spider-Man II and Prowler just as the Green Goblin catches up to them at Prospect Park. Ultimatum, his henchmen, and the Goblinoids attack Spider-Man II, Captain America, Jefferson Davis, Prowler, Bombshell, and Starling. The Green Goblin recovers and attacks Prowler as Ultimatum plans to send Spider-Man II back to Earth-1610. Prowler sacrifices himself to give off a reverse ionic pulse explosion by overloading his suit. This ends up sending Ultimatum and the Green Goblin back to Earth-1610 causing the Goblinoids to regress back to their human form while the remaining henchmen of Ultimatum flee the area.

After Miles and his clone Shift free Quantum from Assessor's control, they learn that Aaron is alive somewhere in a different universe and discover Assessor's connection to the Beyond Corporation. As it turns out, Aaron is trapped in a dystopian alternate future where he is captured by an alternate version of Miles' clone Selim who killed his reality's Miles. After Miles and Shift from the prime universe acquires aid from the resistance force, led by alternate grown up Ganke and Miles' sister, Billie, Aaron, and the alternate elderly Peter Parker are freed from Selim's imprisonment. Following the alternate Ganke's sacrifice on preventing alternate Selim's suicide attempt on destroying New York along with them, Aaron, Miles and Shift stays at the reality to help Billie's resistance on rebuilding the city and restoring its freedom. After the three finally made it home to Earth-616, Aaron helps Shift to be adopted by a mother who is a herbalist, then treats both Miles and Shift bruschetta breads at a dinner, following Miles' successful scholarship achievements.

Spider-Gwen
In the pages of Spider-Gwen which take place on Earth-65, Hobie Brown is a member of the Yancy Street Gang. He and the Yancy Street Gang rooted for Spider-Woman (Gwen Stacy) and were graffiti-spraying a billboard attacking Spider-Woman when Officer Ben Grimm tried to catch them. However, they later witnessed Officer Grimm getting attacked and abducted by Vulture.

Spider-Punk

The Earth-138 version of Hobie Brown operates as Spider-Man but is often called Spider-Punk as his design was inspired by punk rock.

Amazing Spider-Man: Renew Your Vows
During the "Secret Wars" storyline in the pages of Amazing Spider-Man: Renew Your Vows, Prowler is part of the secret S.H.I.E.L.D. resistance against Regent.

Spider Hero
On Battleworld, an alternate version of Hobie Brown was part of Ho Yinsen's Defenders. Originally known as the Prowler, Hobie attempted to take on the Spider-Man identity after his world's Peter Parker was killed by the Inheritors. However, the public quickly realized Hobie wasn't the real Spider-Man, leading the Daily Bugle to dub him "Spider Hero" instead.

In other media

Television
 The Hobie Brown incarnation of the Prowler appears in a self-titled episode of Spider-Man (1994), voiced by Tim Russ. This version worked for the crime lord Iceberg, but feels he is not getting his fair share and starts stealing from him. Upon discovering this, Iceberg orders his men to kill him. After getting into an argument with his girlfriend Angela over his criminal lifestyle, Brown attempts to rob Mary Jane Watson, but is stopped by Spider-Man and sent to jail for violating his parole. While in jail, Brown saves Richard Fisk from an attempt on the latter's life. As a reward, Fisk's father the Kingpin arranges for Brown's release and provides him with the Prowler battlesuit. While taking it on a trial run, Brown re-encounters Spider-Man, whom he manages to evade before exacting revenge on Iceberg. However, Brown soon discovers that his Prowler suit has to be recharged and it can only be done by the Kingpin, who demands that Brown begin working for him in return. To ensure Brown's loyalty, the crime boss modifies the Prowler suit to electrocute him if he tries to disobey and its belt to detonate if tampered with. Brown seeks out Spider-Man's help, and the two join forces to defeat the Kingpin and fix the Prowler suit, allowing Brown to safely remove it. Afterwards, he reconciles with Angela and gives up his life of crime.
 Hobie Brown appears in The Spectacular Spider-Man, voiced by Charles Duckworth. This version is a friend of Flash Thompson's circle at Midtown High, where he is also on the football team as of the episode "Competition". He is also the subject of a running gag wherein he gets interrupted by someone before he can speak. His only speaking role came in the episode "Opening Night", when he takes on the role of Puck in A Midsummer Night's Dream in lieu of Harry Osborn's absence.
 The Hobie Brown incarnation of the Prowler appears in Spider-Man (2017), voiced by Nathaniel J. Potvin. This version acquired his Prowler equipment from his brother, Abraham Brown. In the episode "Bring on the Bad Guys" Pt. 3, Hobie is sent by Silvermane to capture Spider-Man in exchange for Abraham's life. After an unsuccessful attempt to defeat the web-slinger, Hobie and Spider-Man form a reluctant alliance to save Abraham and defeat Silvermane. In "Vengeance of Venom" Pt. 1, Hobie takes part in the heroes' fight to stop the invading symbiotes.

Film
 The Hobie Brown incarnation of the Prowler was set to appear in the opening montage of the unproduced Spider-Man 4, which would have depicted Spider-Man apprehending several C and D-list villains.
 Aaron Davis appears in Spider-Man: Homecoming, portrayed by Donald Glover. The actor was cast in the role in part because he indirectly helped create Miles Morales's character. This version is a low-level criminal with a sense of morality. He attempts to buy high-tech firearms from Herman Schultz and Jackson Brice, only to be interrupted by Spider-Man. The hero later confronts Aaron, webs his hand to his car, and questions him regarding Adrian Toomes's plans. Aaron gives him information about a sale with his former acquaintance Mac Gargan, and admits to wanting to keep the weapons off the streets to protect his nephew. Spider-Man then departs, thanking Aaron for his help and leaving him trapped to his car as punishment for his crimes. In a deleted post-credits scene, Aaron, after unsuccessfully trying to get the webbing off using his keys, calls his nephew to say that he is "not gonna make it".
 The Aaron Davis incarnation of the Prowler appears in Spider-Man: Into the Spider-Verse, voiced by Mahershala Ali. This version shares a close bond with his nephew Miles Morales, encouraging him to pursue his passions, and leads a double life as the Prowler, one of the Kingpin's enforcers. While Aaron's brother Jefferson Davis is initially unaware of the former's criminal affiliations, he is still unhappy about Miles and Aaron spending time together, believing the latter is a bad influence. After discovering Morales had become the new Spider-Man, Aaron refuses to kill him, leading to the Kingpin killing him in retaliation. Jefferson initially mistakes the new Spider-Man for Aaron's killer, but he eventually learns the truth.

Video games
 The Hobie Brown incarnation of the Prowler appears as a playable character in Spider-Man: Friend or Foe, voiced by Chris Gardner. This version is a superhero who wields explosive canisters instead of clawed gauntlets and lacks a cape. He joins S.H.I.E.L.D. shortly before Spider-Man to help stop the P.H.A.N.T.O.M. invasion.
 The Hobie Brown and Aaron Davis incarnations of the Prowler appear as separate playable characters in Spider-Man Unlimited.
 The Aaron Davis incarnation of the Prowler appears as a playable character in Marvel Puzzle Quest.
 The Aaron Davis incarnation of the Prowler appears as a boss in Spider-Man: Miles Morales, voiced by Ike Amadi. This version is a subway worker whose Prowler alter-ego is a thief-for-hire and does not sport a cape. Moreover, Aaron became a criminal as a teenager, much to the disapproval of his police officer brother Jefferson Davis, with whom he became estranged over time. After receiving his Prowler technology from Roxxon, Jefferson discovered Aaron's identity, but agreed not to turn him in on the condition that Aaron stay away from Jefferson's family. Following Jefferson's death in the first game, Marvel's Spider-Man (2018), a grieving Aaron blamed his selfless nature for the tragedy and became overprotective of his nephew Miles Morales, seeing that same selflessness in him and not wanting to lose another relative. After discovering Morales is the second Spider-Man, Aaron reveals his secret identity to him and wins over his nephew's trust. To ensure Morales' safety, Aaron strikes a deal with Roxxon to leave him alone in exchange for his help in finding the Tinkerer. However, Roxxon's R&D department head, Simon Krieger, reneges and captures both. After Morales escapes from Roxxon, Aaron kidnaps him to prevent him from endangering himself, but his nephew defeats him and explains that it is his duty to protect New York. Inspired, Aaron helps him evacuate Harlem amidst the Tinkerer's revenge plot against Roxxon and later turns himself in, offering to testify against Roxxon and Krieger in exchange for a reduced sentence.

Miscellaneous
The Hobie Brown incarnation of the Prowler appears in self-titled comic strip in The Amazing Spider-Man. This version's gauntlets are restricted to using compressed air blasts.

Collected editions

References

External links
 Prowler at Marvel.com
 Prowler's profile at Spiderfan.org

African-American superheroes
Characters created by John Buscema
Characters created by Stan Lee
Comics characters introduced in 1969
Fictional African-American people
Fictional characters from New York City
Fictional engineers
Fictional inventors
Fictional professional thieves
Fictional taekwondo practitioners
Marvel Comics male superheroes
Marvel Comics male supervillains
Marvel Comics martial artists
Marvel Comics sidekicks
Marvel Comics superheroes
Marvel Comics supervillains
Spider-Man characters
Vigilante characters in comics